Mirza Nizamuddin was a mansabdar of the Mughal Empire during the reign of Akbar.

Military career
Akbar appointed Mirza Nizamuddin to send soldiers against Dulla Bhatti. His army was defeated but Dulla Bhatti's mother intervened to ensure that his life was spared.

References

Date of birth unknown
Date of death unknown
Indian Army personnel
Mughal Empire people